The Viru Valley is located in La Libertad Region on the north west coast of Peru.

The Viru Valley Project
In 1946 the first attempt to study settlement patterns in the Americas took place in the Viru Valley, led by Gordon Willey. Rather than examine individual settlement sites, Willey wanted to look at the valley as a whole and the way that each village interacted with the others. The study showed that villages were located in places which reflected their relationship with the wider landscape and their neighbours. The project emphasised the importance for archaeologists of viewing sites holistically and to take into account the economic, environmental, social and political factors acting on past societies.

Willey's groundbreaking study stimulated the work of a number of subsequent archaeologists in the valley. From 1992 to 1998 Dr. Thomas A. Zoubek embarked on a study of the earliest mid and upper valley sites in Viru concentrating specifically at the sites of Huaca El Gallo/La Gallina of Virú culture, in the El Nino Quebrada. These excavations and later ones in the Susanga region completely redefined our knowledge of the earliest agricultural societies in the valley and resulted in the discovery of the earliest ceramics found in coastal Peru that have been dated to c.2400 BCE.

Notable people
 

Julio Castillo Narváez (? –2011), producer and radio news program host, murdered in Viru.

See also
Virú culture
Chavimochic
Chao Valley
Moche valley
Chicama Valley
Jequetepeque Valley

References
Willey, G. R. (1953): Prehistoric settlement patterns in the Virù Valley, Peru. Bureau of American Ethnology Bulletin 155. Smithsonian Institution, Washington, DC.

Archaeology of the Americas
Archaeological sites in Peru
Archaeological sites in La Libertad Region
Valleys of La Libertad Region